Tourville-sur-Pont-Audemer (literally Tourville on Pont-Audemer) is a commune in the Eure department in Normandy in northern France. Its name is derived from its founder Torf.

Population

See also
Communes of the Eure department

References

Communes of Eure